Arcana Studio is a Canadian animation studio in Burnaby, British Columbia, Canada. Founded as a comic book publisher by former Coquitlam, British Columbia school teacher Sean O'Reilly in 2004, in 2012 Arcana opened its animation division.

Overview

Arcana is Canada's largest publisher of comics and graphic novels, with over 300 titles in its library covering all genres and age groups. Arcana's titles have been translated into different languages, including French, Italian, Greek, Spanish and Polish. Arcana formed in 2004 when Sean O'Reilly first published and wrote the comic book series Kade starting with Kade #1. Sean wrote the issue, with artist Eduardo Garcia drawing and coloring the series. With Diamond Comics as the distributor, Arcana's first comic went on shelves December 31, 2003.

In 2004, Arcana Studio was the only comic book company in Canada to participate  in Free Comic Book Day, selling 100,000 copies and went on shelves: July 3, 2004.

The Joe Shuster Award was presented to Arcana for Outstanding Publisher of The Year  for sales during their first year, as voted by the retailers and readers. Kade: Identity followed to become Arcana's first trade paperback book on April 13, 2005. With artist Allan Otero penciling and inking the book.

In 2006, Arcana acquired arcana.com to build one of the biggest online site for comics, graphic novels and characters. Arcana has owned this site since 2004.

Clockwork Girl #0 published with over 150,000 copies on December 5, 2007. It was written by Sean O’Reilly and Kevin Hanna, with Grant Bond as the drawing and coloring artist. A few months later, The Clockwork Girl won silver medal for The Moonbeam Award for Top Comic/Graphic Novel in 2008  as well as the Graphic Novel of the Year. It was recognized as Top Graphic Novel by Foreword Magazine at Book Expo America.

On July 17, 2008, 100 Girls was collected as a trade paperback through Simon & Schuster. It began as an online comic which the writers hoped to bring to print which finally became a reality thanks to Arcana.

Arcana bought The Devil's Due library of graphic novels, acquiring characters such as Banzai Girl, Kore, Blade of Kumori among others on October 1, 2009.

Mighty Mighty Monsters (a series which Sean created) was published and 15 more books follow in the series on September 1, 2010. It was later turned into three 44-minute animated specials. Paradox live action movie debuted on SyFy channel on November 19, 2010. Pixies #1 comic book went on shelves, May 18, 2011.

In 2012, Arcana opened an animation division to develop and produce its content for all platforms including film, television, direct-to-home and digital media. With the opening of its animation division in 2012, Arcana Studio released their first animated feature The Clockwork Girl in 2014, based on the graphic novel with the same name. Arcana buys The Blue Water library of graphic novels with titles like 10th Muse, Legend of Isis, Leprechaun and Blackbeard Legacy on February 15th, 2012.

Arcana went on to produce Kagagi: The Raven, a 13 episode TV mini-series about a First Nations superhero which aired on APTN (Aboriginal Peoples Television Network), and made its debut in 2014.  Arcana's continued success led to the development of its own intellectual properties like Pixies and the Howard Lovecraft trilogy. Pixies was Arcana's first independently created feature which featured well-known actors such as Academy Award winner Christopher Plummer, Alexa PenaVega and Bill Paxton.  Pixies was written and directed by Sean Patrick O'Reilly, who was nominated for a 2016 Leo Awards for best Direction in an Animation Program for his work on the film.

In 2016, Howard Lovecraft and the Frozen Kingdom was released, the first in the three part series.  It is based on the works of H.P. Lovecraft and the graphic novel created by Bruce Brown. The film features the voices of Christopher Plummer, Jane Curtin, Ron Perlman and Doug Bradley. The film won the Official Selection and the Best in Category Sci-Fi title at the Hot Springs International Horror Film Festival 16'.

Its sequel, Howard Lovecraft and the Undersea Kingdom was released the next year in 2017. Mark Hamill joined the cast as Dr. Henry Armitage. Howard Lovecraft and the Undersea Kingdom took home the Best of the Festival Sci-Fi title at Hot Springs International Horror Film Festival 17', as well as an Official Selection at FEARNYC and a Best Director win.

The final film in the trilogy, Howard Lovecraft and the Kingdom of Madness was released in 2018, with both Mark Hamill and Christopher Plummer reprising their roles, and Finn Wolfhard joining the cast. The film was an Official Selection at the 2018 H.P. Lovecraft Film Festival and won the Grand Jury Prize (Feature) at 2018's Epic ACG Fest.

The Steam Engines of Oz, which started out as a Free Comic Book Day Issue, went on to be published as a complete graphic novel. With support of steampunk fans and backers on Kickstarter, The Steam Engines of Oz was successfully funded and was released in 2018, starring Julianne Hough, Matthew Kevin Anderson, Ashleigh Ball, Elijah Dhavvan and Geoff Gustafson.

The Legend of Hallowaiian had its "orange carpet" premiere in L.A. on September 22, 2018, and on DirecTV on the 18th. The film stars Vanessa Williams, Mark Hamill and Noah Schnapp.

Arcana's most recent film, Go Fish was released by Lionsgate in late 2019, and stars Mark Hamill, Kathleen Barr and Asia Mattu. The film won Best Animated Feature at the Xin Guang awards in China.

Upcoming productions include Panda vs. Aliens and Heroes of the Golden Masks, which is set to star Christopher Plummer, Ron Perlman, Patton Oswalt and Osric Chau.

Films, television series, and shorts

Animated films

Live-action features

Animated television series

Short films

The Gwaii  - Based on Haida Gwaii, and the graphic novel of the same story.
Memo – A series of 30-second segments aimed at children.
Polkarella – A short about an umbrella/creature hybrid.
 Pixies – A short film based on the comics and graphic novel of the same name.

Comics

Since its founding in 2004, Arcana has produced and acquired over 250 titles. Books are distributed by Diamond Book Distributors.

Select titles

 100 Girls: The First Girl (2004–2006)
 All Fall Down (2011)
 American Wasteland (2007)
 Amnesia (2011)
 Amour - Volume 1 and 2 (2012)
 Ant: Days Like These (2004–2005)
 Arcana Studio Presents (2004-current, Free Comic Book Day annual)
 Ark (2013)
 The Art of ReBoot (2007)
 Banzai Girl (2007)
 Blank Slate (TBD)
 Blood, Shells, & Roses (2011)
 The Book (2012)
 Burn (2008) 
 Champions of the Wild Weird West
 Chaotic Soldiers (2010)
 Corrective Measures (2008)
 Creepsville (2011)
 Dark Horrors (2006)
 Dead Men Tell No Tales (2005–2006)
 Deadly Harvest (2012)
 Dragon's Lair (2006–2007)
 El Arsenal: Unknown Enemy (2005–2006)
 Eve: Vampire Diva (2007)
 The Evil Tree (2012)
 Ezra:
 Ezra: Egyptian Exchange (2004–2005)
 Ezra: Evoked Emotions (2006–2007) 
 Ezra vs. 10th Muse (2006)
 The Fix (2009)
 Frozen Wasteland (2007)
 Gearhead (2007)
 Grunts (2006)
 Helen Killer (2008)
 Howard Lovecraft and the Frozen Kingdom
 John Henry and The Steam Age (2012)
 Jova's Harvest (2005–2006)
 Kade:
 Kade: Identity (2004–2005)
 Kade: Sun of Perdition (2006–2007)
 Kade: Shiva's Sun (2007–2008)
 Kade: Rising Sun (2010)
 Kade: Red Sun (2010)
 Kade: Prodigal Sun (2011)
 Kade: Mourning Sun (2012)
 Kade: Tribal Sun (2014)
 Kade: Children of the Black Sun (2014)
 Koni Waves (2006)
 Koni Waves (2006)
 Koni Waves: The Headdress of the Undead (2007)
 Koni Waves: First Wave (2007)
 Koni Waves/Demonslayer (2007)
 Koni Waves: Ghouls Gone Wild! (2008)
 Avengelyne vs. Koni Waves (2009)
 Lethal Instinct - Volume 1 (2012)
 Marlow (2008)
 The Network (2008)
 Paradox (2005–2006)
 Penance: Trial of the Century (2008)
 Poe & Phillips (2011)
 Shadowflame (2007)
 SideShows (2011)
 Space Ace (2009)
 Starkweather: Legacy (2004–2005)
 Stranger Danger (2009)
 Sundown: Arizona (2005)
 The Truman Virus (2012)
 Velvet Rope (2008)

All ages titles

 The Ancient Oak (2012)
 A Cat Named Haiku (2010)
 A Cat Named Haiku 2: The Dust Bunny (2013)
 Clockwork Girl (2007)
 Gordon The Giraffe (2012)
 The Gwai (2008)
 Howard Lovecraft and the Frozen Kingdom (2009)
 Howard Lovecraft and the Undersea Kingdom (2012)
 Howard Lovecraft and the Kingdom of Madness (2014)
 Mwumba (2008)
 My Best Friend's a Booger (2011)
 Pixies (2012)
 Ralph Filmore, Paranormal Investigator (2011)
 Scrooge and Santa (2011)
 Summer and Monkey
 Turning Tiger (2012)

The Arcanaverse is the world all the Arcana characters live in. Currently over 3000 individual indexed characters and creatures call the Arcanaverse home. From the Arcanaverse stem new stories and adventures, including the comic book series The Intrinsic.

The Intrinsic

The Intrinsic was debuted on Free Comic Book Day 2012, and was the first Arcanaverse title. The series features hit Arcana characters Kade, Philosopher Rex, Kore, and Candice Crow, as well as cameos by many others. The Intrinsic also made a guest appearance in the animated TV series Kagagi (2014). Volume 2 of The Intrinsic debuted at Free Comic Book Day 2014 and was written by Sean O'Reilly and Chris 'Doc' Wyatt.

Motion comics

Arcana has turned some of its comics and graphic novels into motion comics:

 The Steam Engines of Oz
 The Gwaii 
 Pixies
 The Clockwork Girl 
 Abiding Perdition
 Kagagi

Awards
 Arcana was named Most Promising Company at the 2013 Digi Awards, Arcana's CEO, Sean O'Reilly, was also named a finalist for Executive of the Year at the 2013 Digi Awards.
 CEO Sean O'Reilly received Playback's Ten to Watch award in 2013.
 Arcana was named Best Visual Features 2013 by Arlene Dickinson's YouInc.

Kickstarter: The Steam Engines of Oz

In Arcana's first experience with a crowd-sourcing project, The Steam Engines of Oz was first introduced for Free Comic Book Day, 2013. The idea was to release issues FCBD, 1, 2, and 3 of the collected trade, and then if the Kickstarter campaign proved to be a success, a second volume of the comic would be released. The Steam Engines of Oz: The Geared Leviathan was successful and was produced, thanks to the supporters on Kickstarter.

Charitable work

 Arcana has donated thousands of Clockwork Girl comics to the Boys & Girls Clubs of America under the REACH Literary Program.

References

External links
 Official website

Arcana Studio at the Big Comic Book DataBase

 
Canadian animation studios
Culture of Coquitlam
Joe Shuster Award winners for Outstanding Publisher
2004 establishments in British Columbia
Comic book publishing companies of Canada
Publishing companies established in 2004
Companies based in Burnaby